Schlosstheater Ludwigsburg  is a theatre in Ludwigsburg, Baden-Württemberg, Germany.

Theatres in Baden-Württemberg